Ulau-Suain is an Austronesian language of coastal Sandaun Province, Papua New Guinea. It is spoken in Ulau 1, Ulau 2, and Suain wards of East Aitape Rural LLG, Sandaun Province.

External links 
 Paradisec has two collections of Arthur Cappell's materials (AC1, AC2) and one collection from Malcolm Ross (MR1) that include Ulau-Suain language materials.

References

Schouten languages
Languages of Sandaun Province